Fominskoye is a rural locality (a village) in Kharovskoye Rural Settlement, Kharovsky District, Vologda Oblast, Russia. The population was 27 as of 2002.

Geography 
Fominskoye is located 16 km northwest of Kharovsk (the district's administrative centre) by road. Khomutovo is the nearest rural locality.

References 

Rural localities in Kharovsky District